FM & AM is the third album by American comedian George Carlin. This album was originally released in 1972 on the Atlantic Records subsidiary label Little David Records, later reissued on Carlin's Eardrum Records label. It was also included as part of the 1992 Classic Gold collection, and The Little David Years (1971-1977) box set.

The album incorporates (and mocks) the "clean cut" act Carlin performed on The Ed Sullivan Show on its "AM" side (in monaural), while featuring the counterculture material he was becoming known for on its "FM" side (in stereo with Carlin on the left channel and the audience on the right). Carlin's official website refers to the album as a sort of comedy concept album and says that it "marked Carlin's metamorphosis from straight-laced to hippie, intentionally embracing the growing counterculture."FM & AM'' won the Grammy Award for Best Comedy Album.

Track listing

Side one (FM)
 Shoot – 5:55
 The Hair Piece – 2:53
 Sex in Commercials – 5:20
 Drugs – 4:23
 Birth Control – 5:10

Side two (AM)
 Son of WINO – 6:31
 Divorce Game – 4:29
 Ed Sullivan Self Taught – 3:26
 Let's Make a Deal – 4:48
 The 11 O'Clock News – 7:10

References

External links
 George Carlin's Official Website

1972 live albums
George Carlin live albums
Stand-up comedy albums
Spoken word albums by American artists
Live spoken word albums
Grammy Award for Best Comedy Album
1970s comedy albums
Little David Records live albums